Ifigenija Zagoričnik Simonović (born 24 March 1953) is a Slovene poet, essayist, writer, editor and potter.

Zagoričnik was born in Kranj in 1953. She studied Comparative literature and Slavistics at the University of Ljubljana and from 1978 to 2003 lived in London where she attended Art school and worked as a potter and artist. In 2009 she received the Rožanc Award for her collection of essays Konci in kraji (Bits and Places). She also writes for children.

Published works

 for adults
 Postopna razbremenitev, poetry collection
 Te pesmi, poetry collection
 Drevesa so se takrat premikala in sem pomešala njihova imena, poetry collection
 Krogi in vprašanja, poetry collection
 Kaj je v kamnu, poetry collection
 Konci in kraji, collection of essays

 for children
 Kaj je kdo rekel in česa kdo ni, poetry
 Poljub za princesko Kvakico, fairy tale
 Punčka z grdimi lasmi, fairy tale

 Editorial work
 Pesmi iz zapora (Poems from Prison), collection of seven books, and Pesmi s »prostosti« (Poems from Freedom) by the Slovene writer Vitomil Zupan

References

External links
Ifigenija Simonović on Poetry Magazines site

Slovenian women poets
Slovenian poets
Living people
1953 births
Writers from Kranj
University of Ljubljana alumni
Artists from Kranj